The year 1534 in science and technology included a number of events, some of which are listed here.

Astronomy
 Oronce Finé publishes  in Paris.

Exploration
 April 20 – September 5 – Expedition of Jacques Cartier to the Gulf of Saint Lawrence.
 May 10 – Cartier reaches Newfoundland.
 June 9 – Cartier is the first European to discover the Saint Lawrence River.

Mathematics
 Petrus Apianus publishes  in Nuremberg, on trigonometry and containing tables of sines.

Medicine
 Girolamo Fracastoro publishes Di Vini Temperatura.
 Stefan Falimierz publishes On Herbs and Their Potency.

Births
 September 28 − Samuel Eisenmenger, German physician and mathematician (died 1585)
 November 6 – Joachim Camerarius the Younger, German physician and botanist (died 1598)
 undated − Volcher Coiter, Dutch anatomist (died 1576)

Deaths
 December 13 − Paul of Middelburg, Flemish scientist and bishop (born 1446)
 December 23 – Otto Brunfels, German botanist (born c. 1488)

References

 
16th century in science
1530s in science